Below is a list of space facilities by country.

Algeria 
 Algerian Space Agency

Brazil
 Alcântara Space Center
 Barreira do Inferno Launch Center
 Space Operations Center

Belgium
 Liege Space Center
 Euro Space Center

Canada
 John H. Chapman Space Centre
 Telus World of Science, Edmonton

Germany
 European Space Operations Centre
 German Space Operations Center
 Hubble European Space Agency Information Centre
 European Astronaut Centre

France
 Toulouse Space Centre
 Guiana Space Centre
 Cannes Mandelieu Space Center

India
 Vikram Sarabhai Space Centre
 Space Applications Centre
 Satish Dhawan Space Centre

Italy
 Broglio Space Center

Japan
 Uchinoura Space Center
 Tanegashima Space Center

South Korea
 Naro Space Center

Netherlands
 European Space Research and Technology Centre

Norway
 Andøya Space Center
 Norwegian Space Centre

Philippines
 Mabuhaysat Subic Space Center
 Mabuhaysat Zamboanga Space Center

Pakistan
 Sonmiani (space facility)
 Tilla Satellite Launch Centre

Russia
 Babakin Space Centre
 Baikonur Cosmodrome
 Titov Main Test and Space Systems Control Centre

Sweden
 Esrange Space Center

United Kingdom
 National Space Centre
 Surrey Space Centre
 Harwell Science and Innovation Campus
 Jodrell Bank Observatory

United States
 Goddard Space Flight Center
 John C. Stennis Space Center
 Kennedy Space Center
 Lyndon B. Johnson Space Center and Space Center Houston
 Marshall Space Flight Center

See also
List of launch complexes

References

space facilities